Domusnovas, Domusnoas or Domus Noas (new houses) in Sardinian language,  is a comune (municipality) in the Province of South Sardinia in the Italian region Sardinia, located about  northwest of Cagliari and about  northeast of Carbonia, in the Sulcis-Iglesiente region, in the valley of the Cixerri river.

Domusnovas borders the following municipalities: Fluminimaggiore, Gonnosfanadiga, Iglesias, Musei, Villacidro, Villamassargia.

History
The area of Domusnovas was inhabited since prehistoric times, as attested by the presence of Neolithic walls (demolished in the 19th century) and several nuraghe. During the Roman domination of the island it was a village across the Cagliari-Sulcis road, used to trade the ore extracted in the nearby Metalla.

In the Middle Ages, it was part of the giudicato of Cagliari, and, when in 1257 the latter was conquered by Pisan troops, it became a fief of count Ugolino della Gherardesca. In 1324, it was occupied by the Aragonese.

References

External links

 Official website

Cities and towns in Sardinia